Kelly Evans is a journalist.

Kelly Evans may also refer to:

Kellylee Evans, musician
Kelly Evans (curler) from List of teams on the 2013–14 World Curling Tour
Devon Kelly-Evans, English association football player, brother of Dion
Dion Kelly-Evans, English association football player, brother of Devon